Rendi Saputra (born 28 April 1989) is an Indonesian footballer who currently plays for PSMS Medan.

External links 
 

1989 births
Living people
Indonesian footballers
Association football midfielders
Liga 1 (Indonesia) players
Pelita Bandung Raya players
Persib Bandung players
Persik Kediri players
Persiba Balikpapan players
Sundanese people
Sportspeople from Bandung